Chistopolye is a rural locality (a selo) in Rakityansky District, Belgorod Oblast, Russia. The population was 269 as of 2010. There is 1 street.

Geography 
Chistopolye is located 10 km southeast of Rakitnoye (the district's administrative centre) by road. Sumovsky is the nearest rural locality.

References 

Rural localities in Rakityansky District